Tarawa is an atoll and the capital of the Republic of Kiribati, in the Micronesia region of the central Pacific Ocean. It comprises North Tarawa, which has 6,629 inhabitants and much in common with other more remote islands of the Gilberts group, and South Tarawa, which has 56,388 inhabitants , half of the country's total population. The atoll was the site of the Battle of Tarawa during World War II.

Etymology

Tarawa is an old Gilbertese form for Te Rawa, meaning "The Passage" (of the Lagoon), named for the unusual large ship channel to the lagoon. In the popular etymology based on Kiribati mythology, Nareau, the God-spider, distinguished Karawa, the sky, from Marawa, the Sea, from Tarawa, the land.

Geography
Tarawa has a large lagoon,  in total area, and a wide reef. The lagoon is widely open to the ocean, with a large ship pass. Although naturally abundant in fish and shellfish of all kinds, marine resources are being strained by the large and growing population. Drought is frequent, but in normal years rainfall is sufficient to maintain breadfruit, papaya and banana trees as well as coconut and pandanus.

North Tarawa consists of a string of islets from Buariki in the north to Buota in the south. The islets are separated in places by wide channels that are best crossed at low tide, and there is a ferry service between Buota and Abatao. Only Buota is connected by road to South Tarawa, via a bridge.

On South Tarawa, the construction of causeways has now created a single strip of land from Betio in the west to Tanaea in the northeast.

Climate

Tarawa features a tropical rainforest climate under the Köppen climate classification. From November to March, western gales bring rain and occasional cyclones.

Precipitation varies significantly between islands. For example, the annual average is 3,000 mm (120 in) in the north and 500 mm (20 in) in the south of the Gilbert Islands. Most of these islands are in the dry belt of the equatorial oceanic climatic zone and experience prolonged droughts.

Administration

Tarawa atoll has three administrative subdivisions: Betio Town Council (or BTC), on Betio Islet;  (or TUC), from Bairiki to Tanaea; and Eutan Tarawa Council (or ETC), for North Tarawa or Tarawa Ieta, consisting of all the islets on the east side from Buota northwards. The meaning of Te inainano in Gilbertese language is "down of the mast", alluding to the sail-shape of the atoll 

South Tarawa hosts the capital of the Republic of Kiribati and was also the central headquarters of the Gilbert and Ellice Islands since 1895. The House of Assembly is in Ambo, and the State House is in Bairiki. The offices of the various ministries of the government range from Betio at the south-west extreme to Nawerewere (on an easterly island in its chain), close to Bonriki (International Airport) and Temwaiku. Settlements on North Tarawa include Buariki, Abaokoro, Marenanuka and Taborio.

Diplomatic missions
Four resident diplomatic missions exist: the embassies of China (closed in 2003, re-opened in 2020) and Japan (opened in 2023), and the high commissions of Australia and New Zealand. The United Nations are also present in Kiribati, including UNICEF, UNDP, UNFPA, UNOPS, UN Women, WHO and FAO.

History

In Kiribati mythology, Tarawa was the earth when the land, ocean and sky had not been cleaved yet by Nareau the spider.  Thus, after calling the sky karawa and the ocean marawa, he called the piece of rock that Riiki (another god that Nareau found) had stood upon when he lifted up the sky as, Tarawa. Nareau then created the rest of the islands in Kiribati and also Samoa.

Gilbertese arrived at these islands thousands of years ago, and there have been migrations to and from Gilbert Islands since antiquity.

Evidence from a range of sources, including carbon dating and DNA analyses, confirms that the exploration of the Pacific included settlement of the Gilbert Islands by around 200 BC. The people of Tungaru (native name of the Gilbertese) are still excellent seafarers, capable of making ocean crossings in locally made vessels using traditional navigation techniques.

Thomas Gilbert, captain of the East India Company vessel , was the first European to describe Tarawa, arriving on 20 June 1788. He did not land. He named it Matthew Island, after the owner of his ship Charlotte. He named the lagoon Charlotte Bay. Gilbert's 1788 sketches survive.

The island was surveyed in 1841 by the US Exploring Expedition.

Charles Richard Swayne, the first Resident Commissioner, decided to install the central headquarters of the Gilbert and Ellice Islands protectorate in Tarawa in 1895.
Tarawa Post Office opened on 1 January 1911.

Sir Arthur Grimble was a cadet administrative officer based at Tarawa (1913–1919) and became Resident Commissioner of the Gilbert and Ellice Islands colony in 1926.

During World War II, Tarawa was occupied by the Japanese, and beginning on 20 November 1943 it was the scene of the bloody Battle of Tarawa. On that day U.S. Marines landed on Tarawa and fought Japanese soldiers occupying entrenched positions on the atoll. The Marines captured the island after 76 hours of intense fighting that killed 6,000 people in total.

The fierce fighting was the subject of a documentary film produced by the Combat Photographers of the Second Marine Division entitled With the Marines at Tarawa. It was released in March 1944 at the insistence of President Roosevelt. It became the first time many Americans viewed American servicemen dead on film.. The US built bases on Island.

The Kiribati Government began a road restoration project funded in part by the World Bank in 2014 to re-surface the main road from Betio in the west to Bonriki in the east, upgrading the main road that transits Tarawa from a dirt road. As of 2018, all that remained to be completed of this project was the sealing of the Japanese Causeway, connecting Bairiki and Betio, done in 2019.

Literature and journal
 A Pattern of Islands by Sir Arthur Grimble, John Murray & Co, London, 1952; republished 2011 by Eland, London, 
 Return to the Islands by Sir Arthur Grimble, John Murray & Co, London, 1957
 The 2004 book The Sex Lives of Cannibals by J. Maarten Troost is a lighthearted account of the author's two years living on Tarawa.
 The Precedence of Tarawa Atoll, by H.E. Maude and Edwin Doran Jr, Annals of the Association of American Geographers, Vol. 56, No. 2 (Jun. 1966), pp. 269–289.
 Kiribati. Cronache illustrate da una terra (s)perduta is an illustrated book of Alice Piciocchi (illustrator: Andrea Angeli). March 2016. 24 Ore Cultura, Milan, also in French translation Chronique illustrée d’un archipel perdu, éditions du Rouergue, 2018.
 "Tarawa" by war correspondent Robert Sherrod was published in 1944 and chronicles the WWII battle

In popular culture
Tarawa is the site of the 1944 Pulitzer Prize-winning photograph by Frank Filan, depicting a destroyed bunker.
Leon Cooper, a US Navy Landing Craft Operator who took part in the WWII battle, returned to the island in 2008 to investigate reports the beach he landed on was littered with garbage. His journey was chronicled in the documentary "Return to Tarawa: The Leon Cooper Story", narrated by Ed Harris.
"Tarawa Atoll Sanglant" is a Belgian comic written by Jean-Michel Charlier and Victor Hubinon in 1950.
Leon Uris' 1953 fictional Battle Cry extensively depicts the 1943 battle. (Uris was a Marine on Guadalcanal.)
A 1956 British drama film Pacific Destiny based on the book A Pattern of Islands was made in 1956.
The Far Reaches, a 2007 historical novel by Homer Hickam, describes the Battle of Tarawa.
 In the novel Snow Falling on Cedars, Ishmael Chambers is a World War II US Marine Corps veteran who lost an arm fighting the Japanese at the Battle of Tarawa while watching his friends die. He revisits his part in the battle in a flashback.

Memorial
USS Tarawa was the name of the first LHA-class amphibious assault ship.

See also
Tarawa Climate Change Conference

References

External links

Tarawa on The Web – A History of the Bloodiest Battle
The Marine Assault of Tarawa
Tarawa the Aftermath
"Tarawa" the USCG cat
Exhibit: The Alfred Agate Collection: The United States Exploring Expedition, 1838–1842 from the Navy Art Gallery
Return to Tawara

 
Capitals in Oceania
Populated places in Kiribati
Atolls of Kiribati
Gilbert Islands